Ska Cubano is a London-based group which combines ska and Cuban music such as son and mambo, with elements of other genres including cumbia and calypso.

History
The group was put together by investment manager Peter A. Scott, who in his own words "decided to create an alternative history in which Cuban ska had emerged". He travelled to Santiago de  Cuba with Top Cats singer Natty Bo (Nathan Lerner) in 2001 and there they rehearsed and recorded the Ska Cubano album over a two-year period mainly with local musicians including singer Beny Billy (Juan Manuel Villy Carbonell). In late 2004, Scott and Bo decided to go for a less Cuban sound and formed a line-up in London mainly using UK-based Cuban and other Caribbean musicians (three of whom were/are also members of Top Cats, Natty Bo's traditional ska band ). After some experimentation, with Natty Bo as leader and vocalist, the permanent core of Ska Cubano became : Cubans (from Havana) Rey Crespo and Ernesto Estruch, Jesús Cutiño (Las Tunas), Oreste Noda (Matanzas) and Kico Cowan (Camaguey), together with, from Montserrat, Dr Sleepy (Reuben White),  from Spanish Town, Jamaica, Eddie "Tan Tan" Thornton, from Chiba City, Japan, Miss Megoo (Megumi Mesaku) and Londoner Trevor Edwards, with Beny Billy commuting from Santiago for recordings and performances.

In 2006 Venezuelan Carlos Pena gradually took over as co-lead singer, although Beny continued to record and occasionally tour with Ska Cubano. Trumpeter Jay Phelps also began to perform and record with the band.  The second Ska Cubano album, ¡Ay Caramba!,  was nominated for a BBC World Music Award in the "Culture Crossing" category. The album was described as "imaginatively crafted, brimming with melody, wit and a joyous fusion of rhythms, this album’s about as much fun as you can have with your clothes on". According to the website all.about.jazz their third album, Mambo Ska, released in May 2010, is "A blast - a raucous, riotous, irresistible blast...high octane party and festival music of the first order".

Ska Cubano have performed at major festivals worldwide including Glastonbury, Big Day Out, and WOMAD, and toured to date, in 30 countries.

Bobine by Ska Cubano was used in the soundtrack of the first series of Dexter, an American television series set in Miami. In 2010/11, their song Soy Campesino was used extensively for television adverts for the UK electrical retailer Comet.

The Ska Cubano project was suspended and the band stopped accepting touring requests in 2014.

Band members
Natty Bo (Nathan Lerner) - vocals
Carlos Pena - vocals and minor percussion
Beny Billy (Juan Manuel Villy Carbonell) - vocals
Miss Megoo ( Megumi Mesaku ) - alto and baritone saxophones
Trevor Edwards - trombone
Kico Cowan - tenor saxophone and flute
Rey Crespo (musical director) - double bass and marimbula
Jesús Cutiño - tres (Cuban 3x2-strung guitar)
Ernesto Estruch - piano, organ and violin
Oresta Noda - congas and pailas
Dr. Sleepy (Reuben White) - drumkit
Tan Tan ( Eddie Thornton ) - trumpet
Jay Phelps - trumpet

Discography
Ska Cubano (2003), Victor – reissued (2004), Absolute
¡Ay Caramba! (2005), casinosounds
Ajiaco! The Remix Album, (2008) casinosounds/Universal Portugal [ not, strictly,  a Ska Cubano album but remixes of Ska Cubano tracks by independent DJ's ]
Mambo Ska (2010), casinosounds

Notes

References
Cartwright, Garth (2007) "SKA CUBANO", BBC
Meadley, Phil (2005) "Ska Cubano: Revolution in the head", The Independent, 1 July 2005
Scott, Peter A. "Ska Cubano History", skacubano.com
"Ska Cubano: A Parallel Musical Universe", NPR Music, 6 August 2006
May, Chris (April 20, 2010) "allaboutjazz"

External links

English ska musical groups
Musical groups from London